Blobfish may also refer to the related species Psychrolutes microporos.

Psychrolutes marcidus, the smooth-head blobfish, also known simply as blobfish, is a deep-sea fish of the family Psychrolutidae. It inhabits the deep waters off the coasts of mainland Australia and Tasmania, as well as the waters of New Zealand.

Instead, the flesh of the blobfish is primarily a gelatinous mass with a density slightly less than that of water; this allows the fish to float above the sea floor without expending energy on swimming. The blobfish has a relative lack of muscle, but this is not a disadvantage, as its main food source is edible matter that floats in front of it, such as deep-ocean crustaceans.

Blobfish are often caught as bycatch in bottom trawling nets. It was first discovered around the Norfolk and Lord Howe islands, which are located between Australia and New Zealand. The discovery was made by a team of two dozen scientist during their exploration of submarine habitats. The team towed gear on the ocean floor in order to net and study different species. Among the new species the caught was Psychrolutes marcidus.

The popular impression of the blobfish as bulbous and gelatinous is partially an artifact of the decompression damage done to specimens when they are brought to the surface from the extreme depths in which they live. In their natural environment, blobfish appear more typical for their superclass Osteichthyes (bony fish).

References

External links 
Deep-sea creatures in Te Ara: The Encyclopedia of New Zealand

marcidus
Fish described in 1926